is a Japanese manga series written and illustrated by Mitsuru Miura. It was serialized in Kodansha's Weekly Shōnen Magazine from 1981 to 1984. The Kabocha Wine received the 1983 Kodansha Manga Award for the shōnen category.

The sequel to the manga,  is a one-shot manga published by Seirindo on October 15, 2006.

The third series of the manga,  is published by Akita Shoten.

It has been adapted into a 95 episode anime series by Toei Animation.

The sequel to the anime was in the form of an animated movie, called , which was released on July 14, 1984 by Toei Animation.

On October 26, 2007, wint released a DVD for the live-action movie adaptation of the third manga series, called . Directed by Hitoshi Ishikawa, the movie starred Yoko Kumada.

Characters
 
 Shunsuke is the main character of the series, and Natsumi's love interest. He is very short (Dwarfism) highschool student, being only 145 cm (4’8”). Generally gruff, proud and stubborn, Shunsuke is nonetheless a good-hearted, strong and brave guy. He is afraid of dogs, loves to eat and does not disdain to fight.
 Nickname:  
 Natsumi is the female protagonist of the series, and Shunsuke's girlfriend. She is taller and bustier than the average Japanese girl, being 180 cm (5’9”). She is very sweet, nice, intelligent, judicious, stubborn, energetic, cheerful and agreeable.

Kotaro is Shunsuke's classmate. He is usually very shy and timid, and admires Shunsuke for his masculinity and bravery. He wishes to be just like Shunsuke someday, and does whatever he can to impress him. Outside of school, his family owns a flower shop.

Media

Manga

The Kabocha Wine - Another
The third series of the manga is published by Akita Shoten. As of April 2009, Akita Shoten has published six tankōbon of the manga.

Anime

Toei Animation broadcast the 95 episodes of The Kabocha Wine on TV Asahi between July 5, 1982 and August 27, 1984. The anime is also broadcast in French by Mangas and TF1. It is also broadcast in Italy on Europa 7 and Italia 7.

The anime uses three pieces of theme music.  by Kumiko Kaori is the opening theme for the entire series.  by Toshio Furukawa is the first ending theme, while  by Toshio Furukawa and Keiko Yokozawa is the second ending theme for the anime.

On September 27, 2006, wint released the first DVD box set for The Kabocha Wine. The box set contains the first 48 episodes over 8 DVDs, each with 6 episodes. On November 29, 2006, wint released the second DVD box set for The Kabocha Wine. The second DVD box contains eight DVDs spanning the episodes 49 to 95.

Animation CD
On March 21, 2007, Columbia Music Entertainment released an animation CD for The Kabocha Wine, called The Kabocha Wine Ongakushu. The songs were sung by Osamu Shouji.

References

External links

The Kabocha Wine - Another 

1981 manga
1982 anime television series debuts
1984 anime films
2007 films
Japanese animated films
Animated films based on manga
Shōnen manga
Winner of Kodansha Manga Award (Shōnen)
Live-action films based on manga
Toei Animation television
Toei Animation films
TV Asahi original programming
Kodansha manga
Akita Shoten manga